The Liggett & Myers Open was a golf tournament on the PGA Tour. It was sponsored by the Liggett & Myers Tobacco Company.

It was played in 1972 and 1973 in conjunction with the U.S. Professional Match Play Championship. After the first two rounds of play, the top eight players dropped from the Liggett & Myers Open and joined eight exempt players to compete in the U.S. Professional Match Play Championship. The purse for the Liggett & Myers Open was $100,000 with $20,000 going to the winner, while the purse for the U.S. Professional Match Play Championship was $150,000 with $40,000 going to the winner and $5,000 going to first round losers.

Tournament hosts
1973 MacGregor Downs Country Club in Cary, North Carolina.
1972 Country Club of North Carolina in Pinehurst, North Carolina.

Winners

References

External links
Results for golfstats.com

Former PGA Tour events
Golf in North Carolina
Open